New Zealand Media and Entertainment (abbreviated NZME) is a New Zealand newspaper, radio and digital media business. It was launched in 2014 as the formal merger of the New Zealand division of APN News & Media, APN New Zealand; The Radio Network, part of the Australian Radio Network; and GrabOne, New Zealand's biggest ecommerce website.

NZME brands include flagship national newspaper The New Zealand Herald, regional newspapers Bay of Plenty Times, Rotorua Daily Post, Hawke's Bay Today and Northern Advocate. Its radio division operates multiple networks including the country's largest commercial station Newstalk ZB, as well as The Hits, ZM, Radio Hauraki, Flava, Coast, and Gold. The company also owns the New Zealand rights to the iHeartRadio service.

History
NZME was formed in September 2014 through the merger of the New Zealand division of APN News & Media, APN New Zealand, The Radio Network, part of the Australian Radio Network., and GrabOne, New Zealand's biggest ecommerce website. The launch of the business fueled speculation APN News and Media could be planning to fully separate its New Zealand operations, or issue an initial public offering for up to 60 percent of its New Zealand assets on the NZX. Fairfax Media declined to confirm speculation in The Australian Financial Review that it could buy some or all of those assets.

In June 2016, APN News & Media completed the demerger of NZME, and NZME was listed on the New Zealand Exchange on 27 June 2016   

In 2016, NZME and Stuff Ltd. proposed merging their operations in New Zealand, with Stuff's Australian parent company Fairfax Media receiving a 41% stake in the combine business plus $55 million cash. On 2 May 2017, the Commerce Commission declined to approve the proposed merger. The two companies appealed the Commissions' decision at the Wellington High Court, which upheld the commission's decision on 18 December 2017. In June 2018, the companies appealed the commission's decision at the New Zealand Court of Appeal, which rejected their merger bid on 25 September 2018. In October 2018, NZME and Stuff abandoned their first merger attempt.

In November 2019, NZME confirmed that it had entered into negotiations with Stuff's new Australian owners, Nine Entertainment, to purchase Stuff. As part of the second merger proposal, NZME proposed a "Kiwishare" arrangement that would ringfence Stuff's editorial operations and protect local journalism.

On 14 April 2020, NZME announced that they were making 15% of their workforce redundant (a loss of roughly 200 jobs) as a result of the economic fallout caused by the coronavirus pandemic. On 11 May, NZME tried to purchase rival media company Stuff, a subsidiary of the Australian company Nine Entertainment, for NZ$1 under the pretext of saving jobs during the pandemic. In response, Nine Entertainment terminated further negotiations with NZME. In response, NZME filed an emergency injunction at the Auckland High Court to force Nine Entertainment back into negotiations. On 19 May, the Auckland High Court ruled against NZME's bid for an interim injunction against Nine Entertainment.

Publishing 
The publishing division of NZME reaches an estimated 2.1 million people each week by print, desktop computer and mobile. It includes national New Zealand Herald titles, six other daily newspapers, 23 non-daily newspapers and over 20 websites, mobile sites and apps.

New Zealand Herald
The New Zealand Herald is the flagship title of NZME and is the daily newspaper of Auckland. It has the largest circulation of any newspaper in New Zealand, peaking at over 200,000 copies in 2006, with numbers down to 162,181 by December 2012. Auckland is its main delivery area, but it is also delivered to much of the north of the North Island including Northland, Waikato and King Country.

The Herald's main book publications include New Zealand Herald, Weekend Herald and Herald on Sunday. Its supplements include Be Well on Monday, Travel on Tuesday, Viva, Driven and Herald Homes on Wednesday, TimeOut on Thursday, Canvas on Saturday, and Spy on Sunday.

Regional newspapers
NZME's flagship daily regional papers include The Northern Advocate, Bay of Plenty Times, Rotorua Daily Post, Hawke's Bay Today and the Whanganui Chronicle - New Zealand's oldest newspaper, founded in 1856.

The company also publishes multiple weekly community papers, such as the Bay News, Katikati Advertiser, Te Puke Times, Coastal News, Waihi Leader, Hamilton News, Country News, Taupo and Turangi Weekender, Manawatu Guardian, Whanganui Midweek, and Horowhenua Chronicle

Joint publications 
NZME co-owns the Chinese New Zealand Herald. In 2019, it was reported that the website and content of the Chinese New Zealand Herald is under the operational and editorial control of the state-run China News Service, controlled by Chinese Communist Party's United Front Work Department and subject to state censorship and government propaganda.

Radio 

NZME Radio began as The Radio Network in 1996 when the commercial radio activities of Radio New Zealand were divested by the fourth National government as part of the Ruthanasia free market economic policies of that government. Radio New Zealand Commercial, which included talk networks Newstalk ZB and Radio Sport and music networks Classic Hits and ZM, became privately owned and was renamed The Radio Network. In 2014, it became part of NZME and was rebranded again as NZME Radio.

The majority of the programming on stations is networked from the main studios on Graham Street in Auckland Central. However, Newstalk ZB run local programmes in Wellington, Nelson, Christchurch and Dunedin. The Hits run local breakfast and morning programmes. Auckland station Mix 98.2 was relaunched in 2014, based on stations previously known as Radio i, Easy Listening i, Viva and Easy Mix, later being rebranded in 2020 as Gold. Privately owned Gore station Hokonui Gold is operated by NZME under a long-term lease contract.

History 
Publicly owned Radio New Zealand Commercial became privately owned The Radio Network in 1996, and later that year it also purchased Prospect Media Limited and its eleven Auckland and Hamilton stations. The brands of Auckland's Radio Hauraki and Easy Listening i were retained and launched as nationwide networks, while Hamilton's Easy Listening i, Auckland's The Breeze on 91, Hamilton's The Breeze on 89.8 and the other stations were converted to the former Radio New Zealand brands.

The company was bought out by a syndicate that included United States radio company Clear Channel Communications and publisher Wilson & Horton. Wilson & Horton was then purchased by Ireland-based media conglomerate Independent News & Media, and on-sold to Independent's Australian subsidiary APN. The Radio Network became an APN and Clear Channel networked commercial radio joint venture, like the Australian Radio Network already was, and as a result The Radio Network became part of the Australian Radio Network.

Radio Network House in Christchurch was damaged in the February 2011 Christchurch earthquake beyond repair. The building became infamous for being the first New Zealand demolition by implosion in August 2012. The implosion was conducted by US specialists and went without problems, providing reassurance for contractors planning to carry out similar operations.

Community Radio Network
The Radio Network previously ran a group of provincial radio stations known as the Community Radio Network. Established in June 1998, the network retained the local names and live breakfast shows of each station but began broadcasting a network feed from Taupo for other times of the day. The line-up included Mark Bramley (10a - 2p), Aaron Gillions, Scott Armstrong and Brian Gentill (2p - 7p), and Peter Gosney, Corey K and Duncan Allen (7p - 12a). Other voices heard on the network included Geoff Bargas, Rebecca Ali, Nadine Christiansen, Sarah McMullan, Chris Auer, Marke Dickson and Paul Frost.

On 1 December 2000 CRN stations joined the Classic Hits programme fed from Cook Street Auckland, also operated by TRN.  Where the station had both an FM and AM frequency the FM frequency was usually used to broadcast a localised version of  Classic Hits while the AM frequency was used to broadcast Newstalk ZB. Two stations, Radio Waitomo 1ZW and King Country Radio closed down.
Classic Hits was rebranded as The Hits in April 2014. Stations continuing to operate as The Hits include Tokoroa's Radio Forestland, Taupo's Lakeland FM, Gisborne's 2ZG, Masterton's Radio Wairarapa and Wanganui's River City FM. It also included South Island stations Radio Marlborough in Blenheim, Scenicland FM on the West Coast, 3ZE in Ashburton, Radio Caroline in Timaru and Radio Waitaki in Oamaru.

Current networks 
The NZME radio networks are the result of the re-branding of the Community Radio Network and several further years of brand consolidation. In 2004, Cool Blue 96.1FM in Auckland became the first Flava station and Jammin' Oldies in Hawke's Bay became the first Coast station. Original stations of The Breeze in Auckland and Hamilton, 2QQ in Palmerston North and The Planet 97FM in Nelson became ZM. Classic Rock 96FM in Hawke's Bay was replaced with Radio Hauraki. The station once known as Easy Listening i has subsequently been rebranded as Viva FM, Easy Mix, Mix 98.2 and now Gold (on 105.4FM).

In 2014, the entire Classic Hits network was rebranded as The Hits. Newstalk ZB and The Hits now reach 25 markets, and ZM and Gold AM reach 19 markets. Radio Hauraki reaches 16, Coast reaches 12, and Flava reaches 8.

References

External links
NZME official website

 
Here, There & Everywhere (company)
Mass media companies of New Zealand
Companies based in Auckland
Articles containing video clips
Radio broadcasting companies of New Zealand